The Kilmez is a river in Udmurtia and Kirov Oblast in Russia, a left tributary of the Vyatka. The Kilmez freezes up in November and remains icebound until the second half of April. Its main tributaries are the rivers Lumpun, Loban, and Vala.

References

Rivers of Udmurtia
Rivers of Kirov Oblast